Lemon Tree may refer to:

 Lemon (Citrus limon), a tree bearing fruit
 Lemon myrtle (Backhousia citriodora), an Australian native tree with a distinct lemon smell

Places in Australia
 Lemon Tree, New South Wales
 Lemon Tree Passage, New South Wales
 Lemontree, Queensland

Film, music and literature
 Lemon Tree (film), a 2008 film by director Eran Riklis
 The Lemon Tree (album), an album by Daryl Braithwaite
 "Lemon Tree" (Will Holt song), a song made popular by Trini Lopez
 "Lemon Tree" (Fool's Garden song), a song by Fool's Garden
 "(Here We Go Round) the Lemon Tree", a song by the Move
 The Lemon Trees, a 1990s UK pop band
 "Lemon of Troy", an episode of The Simpsons featuring the theft of Springfield's Lemon Tree
 The Lemon Tree, an arts venue in Aberdeen, Scotland
 The Lemon Tree, a book by Sandy Tolan; 2007 winner of the Christopher Award

See also
 Lemon (disambiguation)